{{Automatic taxobox
|image = Chondrinidae - Solatopupa juliana.JPG
|image_caption = A live but retracted individual of Solatopupa juliana
|taxon = Solatopupa
|authority = Pilsbry, 1917<ref>Pilsbry H. A. (1916-1918). Manual of Conchology. Second Series: Pulmonata, 24. Pupillidae (Gastrocoptinae). pp. i-xii [= 1-12], 1-380, Plates 1-49. Philadelphia. page 234.</ref>
|synonyms_ref = 
|synonyms= Chondrina (Solatopupa) Pilsbry, 1917 
|type_species = Bulimus similis Bruguière, 1792 
|display_parents= 3
}}Solatopupa is a genus of air-breathing land snails, terrestrial pulmonate gastropod mollusks in the subfamily Granariinae of the family Chondrinidae. 

 Distribution 
The distribution the genus Solatopupa is peri-Tyrrhenian, i.e. around the Tyrrhenian Sea (the part of the Mediterranean Sea that is between Italy, Sicily and Sardinia.

 Species 
There are six species in the genus Solatopupa:
 Solatopupa cianensis (Caziot, 1910)
 Solatopupa guidoni (Caziot, 1904)
 Solatopupa juliana (Issel, 1866)
 Solatopupa pallida (Rossmässler, 1842)
 Solatopupa psarolena (Bourguignat, 1859)
 Solatopupa similis'' (Bruguière, 1792)

References 

 Gittenberger, E. (1973). Beiträge zur Kenntnis der Pupillacea. III. Chondrininae. Zoologische Verhandelingen, 127: 1-267, pl. 1-7. Leiden
 Bank, R. A. (2017). Classification of the Recent terrestrial Gastropoda of the World. Last update: July 16th, 2017.

External links 

Chondrinidae
Taxonomy articles created by Polbot